Rockefeller's is a live music venue located in Houston, Texas.

History 
In 1979, Sanford and Susan Criner opened Rockefeller's to serve as a performance space for Houston's music scene. The Criners wanted to create a place where both local talent and already-established acts could play to Houston crowds. They already owned a former bank building, designed by Joseph Finger in 1925; they turned it into a club and used proceeds to renovate the space.

The building's architecture lent itself to a unique performance space. The old bank vault became an artists’ dressing room, while the large lobby created a distinct acoustic atmosphere. Seating was two-tiered, with some of the audience on the ground level and some in balconies that nearly extended over the stage. The venue could seat about 325 guests.

Rockefeller's closed as a public venue in 1997. The owners of Star Pizza purchased the building and it was a private event and wedding space from 1999 to 2014. In 2016, concerts returned to Rockefeller's for the first time in nearly 20 years.

Noted performers
List of noted performers during the 80s and 90s:

Angela Bofill
B.B. King
Bo Diddley
Bonnie Raitt
Carl Perkins
Chet Atkins
Count Basie
Dixie Chicks
Dizzy Gillespie
Don McLean
Stevie Ray Vaughan and Double Trouble
Dwight Yoakam
Ella Fitzgerald
Emmylou Harris
The Fabulous Thunderbirds
Fats Domino
Garth Brooks
James Brown
Janis Ian
Jerry Lee Lewis
Joe Ely
John Lee Hooker
k.d. lang and The Reclines
Kris Kristofferson
Merle Haggard
Muddy Waters
Pieces of a Dream
Radiohead
Ray Charles
Red Hot Chili Peppers
Riders in the Sky
Roy Orbison
Tina Turner
Tito Puente
Waylon Jennings
Widespread Panic

External links
 Houston Folk Music Archive (Woodson Research Center, Rice University)
 Houston Folk Music Archive Guide (Woodson Research Center, Rice University)

References

Music venues in Houston
1979 establishments in Texas